Vladracula almoreum is a pathogenic fungus of the family Rhytismataceae. The fungis is only known to grow on living Indian maple trees in southern Asia.

References

Leotiomycetes